The slaty antshrikes are several species of birds in the family Thamnophilidae that used to be considered conspecific under the name slaty antshrike (Thamnophilus punctatus). The species are entirely para- or allopatric:

 Black-crowned antshrike, Thamnophilus atrinucha
 Northern slaty antshrike, Thamnophilus punctatus
 Guianan slaty antshrike, Thamnophilus (p.) punctatus
 Marañón (or Peruvian) slaty antshrike, Thamnophilus (punctatus) leucogaster
 Natterer's slaty antshrike, Thamnophilus stictocephalus
 Bolivian slaty antshrike, Thamnophilus sticturus
 Planalto slaty antshrike, Thamnophilus pelzelni
 Sooretama slaty antshrike, Thamnophilus ambiguus

Animal common name disambiguation pages